Vilho Aleksander Niittymaa (19 August 1896  – 29 June 1979) was a Finnish athlete who competed in the discus throw, hammer throw and shot put. He won a silver medal in the discus at the 1924 Summer Olympics.

References

1896 births
1979 deaths
People from Pöytyä
Finnish male discus throwers
Olympic silver medalists for Finland
Athletes (track and field) at the 1924 Summer Olympics
Olympic athletes of Finland
Medalists at the 1924 Summer Olympics
Finnish male hammer throwers
Finnish male shot putters
Olympic silver medalists in athletics (track and field)
Sportspeople from Southwest Finland
19th-century Finnish people
20th-century Finnish people